Kentucky Route 1417 (KY 1417), also known as Martin Hill Road, is a  state highway in the U.S. State of Kentucky. Its southern terminus is at KY 44 east of Cupio and its northern terminus is at KY 1526 northeast of Cupio.

Major junctions

Gallery

References

1417
1417